Vigneux-sur-Seine is a railway station in Vigneux-sur-Seine, Essonne, Île-de-France, France. The station was opened in 1973 and is on the Villeneuve-Saint-Georges–Montargis railway. The station is served by the RER Line D, which is operated by SNCF. The station serves the commune of Vigneux-sur-Seine.

Station info
Erected at an altitude at 40 m above sea level, the station is at the 17.832 kilometer point of the Villeneuve-Saint-Georges–Montargis railway, between the stations of Villeneuve-Saint-Georges and Juvisy. The station serves 5,518,200 passengers (2014) annually.

Train services
Local services (RER D) Creil–Orry-la-Ville–Coye–Goussainville–Gare de Lyon–Villeneuve-Saint-Georges–Vigneux-sur-Seine–Évry–Corbeil-Essonnes
Local services (RER D) Villiers-le-Bel–Gonesse–Saint-Denis–Gare de Lyon–Villeneuve-Saint-Georges–Vigneux-sur-Seine–Évry–Corbeil-Essonnes

References

External links

 
 

Railway stations in Essonne
Réseau Express Régional stations
Railway stations in France opened in 1973